Frank Richard White (born 11 November 1939) is a Labour Party politician in the United Kingdom.

Early life
He is the son of Edna Mead and Arthur Leslie White, a sapper with the Royal Engineers, who died in 1943 as a Japanese Prisoner of War while working on the infamous Burma-Siam Railway. Following his education at Folds Road School in Bolton and Bolton Technical School, Frank worked in a mail order distribution firm, becoming an official in the General and Municipal Workers Union. In 1967, he married Eileen Crook at St Augustine's Church, Tonge Moor, Bolton.

Political career
His first elected political office was as a councillor to Bolton County Borough council, representing the Tonge ward from 1964 to 1974. On his second attempt, he was elected at the October 1974 general election as the Member of Parliament (MP) for the marginal Bury and Radcliffe constituency. He was an assistant government whip from 1976 to 1978. His Bury and Radcliffe seat was abolished by boundary changes for the 1983 general election. Instead he stood in the new Bury North seat, but lost to the Conservative candidate Alistair Burt. In 1986, he was elected as a councillor to Bolton Metropolitan Borough council, once again representing the Tonge ward. After ward boundary and name changes in 2004, he represented the Tonge with The Haulgh ward. He attempted to re-enter Parliament in the 1987 general election for Bolton North East, but failed by 813 votes.

Between 2005 and 2006, he served as the Mayor of Bolton, with his wife, Eileen, as Mayoress. He was also the Chairman of Lancashire Co-operative Development Agency; a Magistrate, becoming Chairman of Bolton Magistrates Bench; and Chairman of East Bolton Regeneration Partnership.

An occasional amateur boxer and footballer, he is a keen supporter of Bolton Wanderers and a part-time football referee.

References

External links 
 

1939 births
Living people
GMB (trade union)-sponsored MPs
Labour Party (UK) councillors
Mayors of Bolton
Labour Party (UK) MPs for English constituencies
UK MPs 1974–1979
UK MPs 1979–1983
Labour Party (UK) mayors
Councillors in Bolton